Nenad Višnjić (Serbian Cyrillic: Ненад Вишњић; born 25 April 1983) is a Serbian football defender.

Career
He spent most of his career playing with FK Čukarički with whom he played almost for a decade counting over 150 league matches. During the 2009–10 season he spent the first half season playing with FK Budućnost Podgorica in the Montenegrin First League before returning to Čukarički. During the winter break of the 2010–11 season he moved to another SuperLiga club, FK Borac Čačak. He plays as central defender.

Honours
Budućnost Podgorica
Montenegrin Cup: 2009–10

References

External links
 Nenad Višnjić at Utakmica.rs

1983 births
Living people
Footballers from Belgrade
Serbian footballers
Association football defenders
FK Čukarički players
FK Budućnost Podgorica players
FK Borac Čačak players
Serbian SuperLiga players